Pompeo Luigi Coppini (19 May 1870 – 26 September 1957) was an Italian born sculptor who emigrated to the United States. Although his works can be found in Italy, Mexico and a number of U.S. states, the majority of his work can be found in Texas. He is particularly famous for the Alamo Plaza work, Spirit of Sacrifice, a.k.a. The Alamo Cenotaph, as well as numerous statues honoring Texan figures.

Early years
Coppini was born in Moglia, Mantua, Italy, the son of musician Giovanni Coppini and his wife, Leandra (Raffa) Coppini. The family moved to Florence where at the age of ten, Pompeo was hired to make ceramic horses shaped like whistles.

From there, he worked for a sculptor who made tourist knock-offs of great works of art. At age sixteen, he studied at Accademia dell'Arte del Disegno under Augusto Rivalta.  Upon earning a degree, Coppini opened a short-lived studio making gratis busts of local celebrities.  While working for a cemetery monument sculptor, Coppini tried to become co-owner of the business by courting the owner's daughter.  The girl's mother balked, and the resulting situation got Coppini denounced from a local priest's pulpit.

The United States

Coppini emigrated to the United States in March, 1896 with nothing but a trunk of clothes and $40 to his name. He got a job in New York sculpting figures for a wax museum.  Elizabeth di Barbieri of New Haven, Connecticut arrived, accompanied by a chaperone, to model for Coppini's memorial to Francis Scott Key.  He fell in love  and married his model.  Coppini became a United States citizen in 1902.

While he managed to find work in New York, Coppini was frustrated the fame and greatness escaped him. He moved to Texas in 1901, to join with German-born sculptor Frank Teich. 

He was then commissioned to do the figures for the Confederate monument for the state capitol grounds.  For the next fifteen years, he lived and worked in San Antonio. After spending a short time in Chicago, Illinois, he then spent three years in New York City overseeing the Littlefield commission for the University of Texas at Austin. He collaborated with architect Paul Cret on the Littlefield Memorial Fountain, and sculpted six statues for the campus.

By 1910, Coppini was assisted by sculptor Waldine Tauch, who had been born in Schulenburg, Texas.  Tauch became more-or-less his adopted daughter, student and protégée, and he, after extracting a promise from her that she would never marry, molded her into a devotee of classical sculpture.  She collaborated with Coppini until his death.

The William P. Rogers chapter of the United Daughters of the Confederacy raised $5,000 in 1911 and commissioned Coppini to design and erect the 1912 Confederate soldier memorial statue named Last Stand, a.k.a. Firing Line, in De Leon Plaza, Hiring Otto Zirkel of near the San Antonio studio to build the stone portion of the monument.

He sculpted three distinct statues of George Washington. The first, commissioned by Americans living in Mexico to commemorate the 1910 centennial of Mexican Independence, was installed in 1912 in the Plaza Dinamarca (renamed Plaza Washington) of the Colonia Juárez section of Mexico City. The Mexican Civil War was just beginning. Two years later, in reaction to the April 1914 United States invasion of Veracruz, the statue was toppled from its pedestal and dragged through the streets. The second statue was created to commemorate the 1926 sesquicentennial of the Declaration of Independence. It was installed in 1927 in Portland, Oregon. The third statue was commissioned by the Texas Society, Daughters of the American Revolution to commemorate the 1932 bicentennial of Washington's birth. Fund-raising problems delayed the project for years, and it was installed in February 1955 on the campus of the University of Texas at Austin.

In 1931, Italy decorated  Coppini with the Commendatore of the Order of the Crown of Italy for his contribution to art in America.  The Texas Centennial Committee awarded Coppini the 1934 commission to design the Texas Centennial half dollar.   In 1937, Coppini opened his San Antonio studio on Melrose Place, in order to work on what would become the Spirit  of Sacrifice (a.k.a. The  Cenotaph) at Alamo Plaza.  Baylor University awarded Coppini an honorary doctor of fine arts degree in 1941.  From 1943 to 1945 he was head of the art department of Trinity University in San Antonio.  In 1945 he and Tauch cofounded the Classic Arts Fraternity in San Antonio (renamed Coppini Academy of Fine Arts in 1950).

Many of his works are in Austin, Texas, displayed on the grounds of the Texas State Capitol and on the campus of The University of Texas. Coppini's statue of Lawrence Sullivan Ross, Texas Governor and third president of Texas A&M University is considered one of the most revered works on the A&M campus in College Station and students often place coins at the statue's feet for good luck on exams. Coppini's marble statue of Senator James Paul Clarke stands in the U.S. Capitol.  Coppini also designed two bronze sculptures at Baylor University in Waco, Texas—those of former Baylor University President Rufus C. Burleson, located on the Burleson Quadrangle on the Baylor campus (1905), and Baylor University namesake and founder Judge R.E.B. Baylor (1939). One of Coppini's best works, as stated by the artist, is the bronze sculpture of John Reagan, former U.S. Senator from Palestine, Texas, located in that city's Reagan Park (1911), featuring the personification of the "Lost Cause of the Confederacy" seated at the base of the monument.

Coppini died in San Antonio on September 26, 1957.  He designed his own crypt or his final resting place in Sunset Memorial Park.

Selected works

Jefferson Davis (1901–1903), Confederate Monument, Texas State Capitol, Austin, Texas.
Confederate Monument (1903), Paris, Texas:
Bust of Jefferson Davis.
Bust of Robert E. Lee.
Bust of Stonewall Jackson.
Bust of Albert Sidney Johnston.
Rufus C. Burleson (1903), Burleson Quadrangle, Baylor University, Waco, Texas.
The Victims of the Galveston Flood (1903–04), University of Texas at Austin.
Terry's Texas Rangers Monument (1905–1907), Texas State Capitol, Austin, Texas.
Hood's Texas Brigade Monument (1910), Texas State Capitol, Austin.
Come and Take It Monument (1910), Gonzales, Texas.
Sam Houston Grave Monument (1910–11), Huntsville, Texas.
John Hunt Morgan Memorial (1911), (former) Fayette County Courthouse, Lexington, Kentucky.
John H. Reagan Memorial (1911), Palestine, Texas.
Bust of Thomas Mitchell Campbell, Governor of Texas 1907-1911, (1911), Private Collection, Palestine, Texas 
Statue of George Washington (1911–12), Mexico City, Mexico.
Confederate Monument (1911–12), De Leon Plaza, Victoria, Texas.
Queen of the Sea monument (1914), Corpus Christi, Texas
Bust of William Rufus Shafter, (1919),  Galesburg, Michigan,
Lawrence Sullivan Ross (1917–1919), Texas A&M University, College Station, Texas.
The Spirit of the Texas Cowboy (1918–19), Charles H. Noyes Memorial, Ballinger, Texas.
George W. Littlefield Commission (1920–1928), University of Texas at Austin:
Littlefield WWII Memorial Fountain, Paul Cret, architect. 
John H. Reagan.
Robert E. Lee.
Albert Sidney Johnston.
James Stephen Hogg.
Jefferson Davis.
Woodrow Wilson.
Senator James Paul Clark of Arkansas (1921), National Statuary Hall Collection, United States Capitol, Washington, D.C.
Bronze doors (1926), Scottish Rite Cathedral (Masonic), San Antonio, Texas.
Statue of George Washington (1926–27), Friendship Masonic Lodge 160, Portland, Oregon.
Texas State Fair Hall of State (1935–36), Fair Park, Dallas, Texas:
Stephen F. Austin.
Thomas J. Rusk.
William B. Travis.
James W. Fannin.
Mirabeau B. Lamar.
Sam Houston.
Cenotaph to the Heroes of the Alamo (1937–38), Alamo Plaza, San Antonio, Texas.
Coppini Tomb (1953), Sunset Memorial Park, San Antonio, Texas.
Statue of George Washington (1955), University of Texas at Austin.

Gallery

References

Further reading

External links

The Coppini Academy of Fine Art (his former workshop)

Texas State Preservation Board: Texas State Capitol Monuments
The University of Texas at Austin: Tour: Statues
Texas A&M University: Outdoor Sculpture

1870 births
1957 deaths
University of Texas at Austin people
Artists from Mantua
Italian emigrants to the United States
Davy Crockett
19th-century Italian sculptors
Italian male sculptors
20th-century American sculptors
American male sculptors
National Sculpture Society members
Sculptors from Lombardy